Machap is a state constituency in Johor, Malaysia, that is represented in the Johor State Legislative Assembly.

Demographics

History

Polling districts 
According to the federal gazette issued on 30 March 2018, the Machap constituency is divided into 12 polling districts.

Representation history

Election results

References 

Johor state constituencies